Michael F. Flaherty (born 1969) is an at-large member of the Boston City Council. Flaherty is a member of the United States Democratic Party. He was elected Boston City Council Vice President in 2001 and Boston City Council President from 2002 to 2006. He unsuccessfully ran for mayor in 2009.

Biography

Flaherty is from South Boston. His father, Michael F. Flaherty, Sr., is a former associate justice of the Boston Municipal Court and a former state representative. He is a graduate of Boston College High School and Boston College, and earned his law degree at Boston University. Prior to being elected to the Council in 1999, he was an assistant district attorney in the Suffolk County District Attorney's Office.

City Council
Flaherty was first elected to the council in November 1999, as an at-large member. He was then re-elected to multiple two-year terms, serving through 2009. He was the top vote-getter in the city council at-large race in November 2003, November 2005, and November 2007. His margin of victory in 2005 over first runner-up Felix D. Arroyo was 5,671 votes, the widest margin since the council was restructured in 1983. He did not run for re-election in November 2009, as he was running for Mayor of Boston. In the November 2011 election, Flaherty placed fifth in the at-large race, missing the fourth and final seat by 925 votes. In the November 2013 election, Flaherty returned to the council as an at-large member. He has subsequently been re-elected in November 2015 and November 2017. He was again re-elected in November 2019. He was the lead vote-getter in the 2021 Preliminary Municipal Election.

Notable events
Flaherty gained media attention in April 2019 by way of his comments regarding a proposal to charge for resident parking permits. In a City Council hearing on the issue, he stated that bus stop spacing and stop length were a major cause of the city's parking woes and instead suggested coordinating with the MBTA to start a conversation about removing some of them. His comments were met with backlash from the public and transportation advocates, with many pointing to his ownership of five cars in a city as the real problem. The Twitter hashtag "#FiveCarFlaherty" was used by many to voice their opposition to his comments.

In 2021, he was among a group that voted against legislation, which ultimately was passed by a 7-5 vote of the City Council, that restricted the use of rubber bullets, tear gas, and pepper spray by the Boston Police Department.

Boston mayoral campaign

Flaherty announced on January 25, 2009, that he was running for Mayor of Boston. He raised more than $600,000 for his campaign. According to The Boston Globe, only 9% of Flaherty's contributions came from out-of-state, compared to fellow candidate Sam Yoon's 58%.

After finishing second to incumbent Thomas Menino in the preliminary election in September, Flaherty was defeated by Menino in the general election on November 3, 2009. Flaherty lost by the smallest margin (57% to 42%) of anyone who ran against Menino in a mayoral race.

Electoral history

City Council

 write-in votes

References

Further reading

External links
 Profile at boston.gov
 

1969 births
Living people
Boston College alumni
Boston College High School alumni
Boston University School of Law alumni
Boston City Council members
Lawyers from Boston
People from South Boston
Massachusetts Democrats
21st-century American politicians